Valentin Dragnev (born 5 March 1999) has been an Austrian grandmaster since 2018, an international master since 2016 and a FIDE master since 2014. He is currently the 2nd best player in Austria and 431st in the world. His highest rating was 2564 (in October 2020). He is the Austrian chess champion in 2020 and got 2nd place in the Austrian championship in 2018. He participated in the 42nd and 43rd chess olympiads.

References

1999 births
Chess grandmasters
Austrian chess players
Living people